Hanging in the Balance is the fifth album by American heavy metal band Metal Church, released in 1993. It was Metal Church's last album before their two-year break up from 1996 to 1998, and the last to feature vocalist Mike Howe for more than two decades until his return to the band in 2015. It is also their last studio album with longtime guitarist Craig Wells and drummer Kirk Arrington (until his return on 2004's The Weight of the World).

Track listing

Personnel
Metal Church
Mike Howe – vocals
Craig Wells – lead guitar
John Marshall – rhythm guitar
Duke Erickson – bass
Kirk Arrington – drums

Additional musicians
Kurdt Vanderhoof – additional guitars
Jerry Cantrell – lead guitar on "Gods of Second Chance"
Randy Hansen – lead guitar on "Conductor"
Joan Jett, Allison Wolfe, Kathleen Hanna – backing vocals on "Little Boy"

Production
Thom Panunzio – producer, engineer, mixing at The Hit Factory, New York
Kenny Laguna – producer
Paul O'Neill – producer on tracks 1, 5, 6, 10, musical director, arrangements with Kurdt Vanderhoof and Metal Church
Adam Kasper, Chuck Johnson, Glen Robinson, John Aiosa, Lee Anthony, Thom Cadley – assistant engineers
Greg Calbi – mastering at Sterling Sound, New York

References

1993 albums
Metal Church albums
Albums produced by Paul O'Neill (rock producer)
Blackheart Records albums
SPV/Steamhammer albums
Albums produced by Thom Panunzio